Robert Henley Henley, 2nd Baron Henley (3 September 1789 – 3 February 1841), was a British lawyer and member of parliament.

Life
Born Robert Henley Eden, he was the son of Morton Eden, 1st Baron Henley, and Lady Elizabeth Henley, youngest daughter of Lord Chancellor Robert Henley, 1st Earl of Northington (c. 1708 – 1772). He was educated at Eton College, and matriculated at Christ Church, Oxford in 1807, graduating B.A. 1811, and M.A. 1814.

Henley served as a Master in Chancery from 1826 to 1840 and between 1826 and 1830 he also sat as member of parliament for Fowey. In 1830 he succeeded his father as second Baron Henley, but as this was an Irish peerage it did not entitle him to a seat in the House of Lords. The following year, Lord Henley assumed by royal licence the surname of Henley in lieu of Eden. in commemoration of his maternal ancestors, and the same year he published a biography of his maternal grandfather, entitled Memoir of the Life of Robert Henley, Earl of Northington, Lord High Chancellor of Great Britain.

Family
Henley married Harriet Peel, daughter of Sir Robert Peel, 1st Baronet, and sister of Prime Minister Sir Robert Peel, 2nd Baronet, in 1823. He died in February 1841, aged 51, and was succeeded in the barony by his son Anthony. Lady Henley died in 1869.

References

Kidd, Charles, Williamson, David (editors). Debrett's Peerage and Baronetage (1990 edition). New York: St Martin's Press, 1990.

1789 births
1841 deaths
19th-century British writers
Barons in the Peerage of the United Kingdom
UK MPs 1826–1830
Henley, B2
Robert Henley
Members of the Parliament of the United Kingdom for Fowey
Barons in the Peerage of Ireland
Barons Henley
British biographers